4-Toluenesulfonyl chloride (p-toluenesulfonyl chloride, toluene-p-sulfonyl chloride) is an organic compound with the formula CH3C6H4SO2Cl.  This white, malodorous solid is a reagent widely used in organic synthesis.  Abbreviated TsCl or TosCl, it is a derivative of toluene and contains a sulfonyl chloride (−SO2Cl) functional group.

Uses

In characteristic manner, TsCl converts alcohols (abbreviated ROH) into the corresponding toluenesulfonate esters, or tosyl derivatives ("tosylates"):
 CH3C6H4SO2Cl  +  ROH  →  CH3C6H4SO2OR  +  HCl
Tosylates can be cleaved with lithium aluminium hydride:
 4 CH3C6H4SO2OR  +  LiAlH4  →  LiAl(O3SC6H4CH3)4  + 4 RH
Thus, tosylation followed by reduction allows for removal of a hydroxyl group.

Likewise, TsCl is used to prepare sulfonamides from amines:
CH3C6H4SO2Cl  +  R2NH   →   CH3C6H4SO2NR2  +  HCl
The resulting sulfonamides are non-basic and, when derived from primary amines, are even acidic.

TsCl reacts with hydrazine to give p-toluenesulfonyl hydrazide.

The preparation of tosyl esters and amides are conducted in the presence of a base, which absorbs hydrogen chloride. The selection of the base is often crucial to the efficiency of tosylation.  Typical bases include pyridine and triethylamine.  Unusual bases are also used; for example, catalytic amounts of trimethylammonium chloride in the presence of triethylamine is highly effective by virtue of the trimethylamine.

Other reactions
Being a widely available reagent, TsCl has been heavily examined from the perspective of reactivity. It is used in dehydrations to make nitriles, isocyanides and diimides.  In an unusual reaction focusing on the sulfur center, zinc reduces TsCl to the sulfinate, CH3C6H4SO2Na.

Manufacture
This reagent is inexpensively available for laboratory use.  It is a by-product from the production of ortho-toluenesulfonyl chloride (a precursor for the synthesis of the common food additive and catalyst saccharin), via the chlorosulfonation of toluene:
 CH3C6H5  +  SO2Cl2  →  CH3C6H4SO2Cl  +  HCl

Hazards  
Tosyl chloride is considered to be a toxic and corrosive substance.

References

Reagents for organic chemistry
Sulfonyl halides
p-Tosyl compounds
Foul-smelling chemicals